Bridget Louise Christie (born 17 August 1971) is an English stand-up comedian, actress and writer. She has written and performed 12 Edinburgh Festival Fringe shows and several comedy tours, in addition to radio and television work. She has received British and international comedy awards and is also an award-winning newspaper columnist and author.

Early life and education
Christie grew up in Gloucester, England, the youngest of nine siblings born to Irish parents. She attended St Peter's Roman Catholic High School in Gloucester.

In 1994 she won a three-year scholarship to study drama at the Academy of Live and Recorded Arts in Wandsworth, London.

Career
Christie appeared in various theatre productions and adverts before she began stand-up in 2004. She was one of the finalists in the Funny Women Awards which that year was won by Zoe Lyons. She was described by the show's founder, Lynne Parker as "one of the most influential funny women who has ever entered our competition".

Her debut BBC Radio 4 series, Bridget Christie Minds the Gap, was broadcast in April 2013. A second series was broadcast in January 2015 followed by a third, Bridget Christie's Utopia, in January 2018.
 The three series were well-received and won several radio awards including Best Radio at the 2014 Chortle Awards and the 2014 Rose D'Or International Broadcasting Award.

Her debut book, A Book for Her, was published in July 2015 to acclaim from The Daily Telegraph and The List and The Observer. The paperback was released in February 2016 and the Spanish version in Barcelona in March 2017.

Christie has written for The Sunday Times, The Times, The Independent, and The Observer. She had a weekly column in Guardian Weekend magazine from October 2015 to March 2016.

In 2015 she won a Red Magazine Women of the Year Award and a Marie Claire Women at the Top Award.

In May 2016, Christie recorded her debut stand-up special, Stand Up for Her (Live from Hoxton Hall), produced by Baby Cow Productions. It was released direct to Netflix on 31 March 2017.

She has written and performed 12 acclaimed consecutive solo Edinburgh Festival shows. Her Edinburgh festival shows A Bic for Her, An Ungrateful Woman and her Brexit-themed  "Because You Demanded It" was The Guardian's No 1 Comedy of the Year 2016.

In 2020, she was a finalist for Best Scripted Comedy (Longform) BBC Audio Drama Awards.

Television appearances
Christie has appeared on several TV comedy programmes, including It's Kevin (BBC2), QI, The Omid Djalili Show (BBC1), Harry Hill's Little Cracker (Sky), Anna and Katy (Channel 4), The Culture Show (BBC2), Mel & Sue (ITV), Alan Davies: As Yet Untitled (Dave).  Have I Got News for You (BBC1) for which she was nominated for a 2014 British Comedy Award for Best Female TV comic, the Alternative Comedy Experience (Comedy Central), Room 101 (BBC1), Cardinal Burns (Channel 4), Celebrity Squares (ITV), This Week (BBC One) and Harry Hill's Alien Fun Capsule (ITV). In 2020 she appeared in BBC One's hit comedy Ghosts as Annie, a ghost who said four words. She reprised the role in 2022. In November 2021, Christie was announced as a contestant in series 13 of Taskmaster (Channel 4) which began airing in April 2022. In March 2022 Channel 4 announced that Christie will star in The Change (TV series), a six-part comedy-drama series; which she also created and wrote.

Radio
Work for BBC Radio 4 and others includes Andy Zaltzman's History of the Third Millennium,  Miranda Hart's House Party, It's Your Round, Sarah Millican's Support Group, The Fred MacAulay Show, Dan Tetsell's The 21st Century for Time Travellers, The Now Show, Kerry’s List, It's Not What You Know, Dilemma, French and Saunders' Christmas Show, and The Casebook of Max and Ivan. In 2019, she became curator of the museum on the Radio 4 series The Museum of Curiosity.

In 2022 she won the BBC Audio Drama Award for her series “Mortal” a four-part series about life and death which she recorded herself from home during lockdown.

Podcasts
Christie has appeared on a number of podcasts including Danielle Ward's Do The Right Thing, Richard Herring's Leicester Square Theatre Podcast, Pappy's Flatshare Slamdown, Jarlath Regan's An Irishman Abroad, Stuart Goldsmith’s The Comedian’s Comedian, The Adam Buxton Podcast, The Penguin Podcast with Richard E. Grant, Literary Death Match, Off Menu with Ed Gamble and James Acaster, and Spotify podcast We Need to Talk About.

Appearances in other shows 
 Taskmaster series 13 (2022)
 White Rabbit, Red Rabbit, Edinburgh Fringe (2011)
 Celebrity Autobiography, Edinburgh Fringe (2010) and Leicester Square Theatre
 The School for Scandal, Edinburgh Fringe (2009)

Awards
 Marie Claire – Women at the Top Awards 2015 – winner
 Red magazine Women of the Year Awards 2015 (Creative) – winner
 South Bank Sky Arts Award for Best Comedy for A Bic for Her (2014) – winner
 Edinburgh Comedy Award for Best Show with A Bic for Her (2013) – winner
 Funny Women Best Show Fringe Award for The Court of King Charles II (2007) – winner

Personal life
Christie married comedian Stewart Lee in 2006. They live in Stoke Newington, London, and have two children.

References

External links
 Official website

1971 births
Living people
English women writers
English women comedians
English television actresses
English stage actresses
English people of Irish descent
People from Gloucester
Actresses from Gloucestershire
People educated at St Peter's High School, Gloucester